The Sugarloaf Hydroelectric Power Station is a now decommissioned mini hydroelectric power station, opened 20 March 1929 by the Premier Sir William McPherson.

References

Hydroelectric power stations in Victoria (Australia)